"On Bended Knee" is a song by American R&B group Boyz II Men for the Motown label. The song, which was written and produced by Jimmy Jam and Terry Lewis, was released in November 1994 as the second single from their second album, II (1994). The song reached number one on the US Billboard Hot 100 Airplay chart and number two on the Billboard Hot Singles Sales chart on December 3, 1994. It stayed at number one for a total of six weeks.

The single is notable for having replaced the previous Boyz II Men single, "I'll Make Love to You", as the top song on the Billboard Hot 100. This was the first time that an act had replaced itself at number one since the Beatles, when "I Want to Hold Your Hand", "She Loves You", and "Can't Buy Me Love" monopolized the top of the chart for a total of 14 weeks. In the lyrics of the song, the speaker begs "on bended knee" for his ex-lover to come back to him, and apologizes for his wrongdoing.

Critical reception
Gerald Martinez from New Sunday Times wrote that the song, along with its predecessor "I'll Make Love to You", "tries to recapture the magic of "End Of The Road", and they come close. Big production numbers with solid hooks, they should be flooding our airwaves for the next few months." Paul Evans from Rolling Stone declared it as a "lush swoon-and-croon" ballad "of the kind the Boyz' hard-core fans demand."

Music video
The accompanying music video for "On Bended Knee", directed by Lionel C. Martin, featured the band members and their breakup and eventual reconciliation with four famous actresses: Kim Fields, Renée Jones, Lark Voorhies, and Victoria Rowell. The video was filmed in New Orleans, Louisiana. It includes footage from Audubon Park, a streetcar, and the French Quarter.

The video begins with Wanya's girlfriend (Voorhies) in the car with him, accusing him of looking at another woman at the grocery store, and she gets out of the car, leaving Wanya alone. He eventually finds her sitting on bleachers where they make up. Shawn meets a girl (Rowell) with a dog at the park and falls in love with her after just meeting her. Michael gets into a fight with his girlfriend (Jones) on his birthday and he's shown alone, drawing a picture of her, but then she comes back to him. Nathan is shown concentrating more on writing music than spending time with his girlfriend (Fields), which frustrates her so she writes a breakup note on his mirror and leaves him, but she eventually returns to him. The band appears singing on the subway and in the rain.

Track listings

 US maxi-CD single
 "On Bended Knee" (human rhythm remix) – 5:29
 "On Bended Knee" (swingamix) – 5:26
 "On Bended Knee" (LP version) – 5:29
 "On Bended Knee" (human rhythm remix instrumental) – 5:29
 "I'll Make Love to You" (remix – sexy version) – 4:33

 German single
 "On Bended Knee" (radio edit) – 4:33	
 "End of the Road" (pop edit) – 3:39

 Europe maxi-CD single
 "On Bended Knee" (radio edit) – 4:33
 "On Bended Knee" (LP version) – 5:29
 "End of the Road" (pop edit) – 3:39
 "Al Final del Camino" ("End of the Road" – Spanish version) – 5:50

Charts

Weekly charts

Year-end charts

Decade-end charts

Release history

References

1994 singles
1994 songs
Billboard Hot 100 number-one singles
Boyz II Men songs
Contemporary R&B ballads
Motown singles
RPM Top Singles number-one singles
Song recordings produced by Jimmy Jam and Terry Lewis
Songs written by Jimmy Jam and Terry Lewis